Uvaria dac is a species of flowering plant in the family Annonaceae, native to Indochina. Anti-austerity agents can be derived from its leaves.

References

dac
Flora of Indo-China
Plants described in 1906